CNNC International Limited (中核國際有限公司) is a Chinese company listed in the Hong Kong Stock Exchange. It is a subsidiary of China National Nuclear Corporation ("CNNC", Chinese: 中国核工业集团公司), and is primarily focused on developing overseas uranium resources.

History
The company was incorporated in Cayman Islands . It was formerly known as United Metals Holdings Limited (科鑄技術集團有限公司), and was listed in the Hong Kong Stock Exchange on 6 January 2003.

In June 2008, CNNC acquired the controlling share of the company at a price of HKD 1.77 per share via its subsidiary. On 12 December 2008, the company adopted its current company name.

Shareholders
According to the 2015 Annual Report of the company, CNNC is the largest shareholder of the company, holding 66.72% of the issued share capital of the company. CNNC is a state-owned enterprise supervised by the State-owned Assets Supervision and Administration Commission.

See also
Nuclear power in China
China National Nuclear Corporation

References

Companies listed on the Hong Kong Stock Exchange
Companies established in 2002